The National board of the CDU (literally: CDU federal board) is the highest permanent body of the Christian Democratic Union of Germany. The board meets at least 6 times a year. The daily affairs of the party is the responsibility of the CDU presidium.

The board consists of the CDU chair, the Secretary General, the four deputy chairs, the treasurer, the honorary chairs, seven elected members of the presidium and 26 elected board members. It also consists of the Chancellor of Germany, the President or Vice President of the Bundestag, the chair of the CDU/CSU faction, the President of the European Parliament and the chair of the European People's Party if these are CDU members. Additionally, the chairs of the CDU state parties are board members.

Christian Democratic Union of Germany